Tsinghua Tongfang Co., Ltd. is a Chinese state-owned software company based in Beijing. It is engaged in consumer electronics, information technology, energy and environment industries. IT businesses include information systems, application systems, digital television systems and web application. Energy and environmental business include environmental protection and energy saving. Tsinghua Tongfang markets TVs in North America, Europe and Australasia under many brands, including Seiki Digital, Element Electronics and Westinghouse Digital.

Tsinghua Tongfang was established in 1997 and listed on the Shanghai Stock Exchange at the same year. In 2019, China National Nuclear Corporation became the controlling shareholder of Tsinghua Tongfang.

Tsinghua Tongfang manufactures its own in-house brand of televisions under the brand THTF.

Investment
Tongfang builds industry chains with focus on two major business: information industry and energy environment industry. This mainly includes the production and service of products like PCs, LED chips, security systems, digital TVs, digital city and environment protection.

Tongfang's investment is mainly concentrated on North China, covering all large cities in China, and its investment overseas continues to expand. Tongfang entered a period of rapid growth in the year of 2007.

Besides its continued investment in PC, container inspection system, environmental protection technology in recent years, it also has enlarged the investment in high-tech products, like LED chip, RFID, digital TV and e-government, making its investment projects scattered.

References

External links 

Companies based in Beijing
Chinese companies established in 1997
Information technology companies of China
Tsinghua University
Government-owned companies of China
Companies listed on the Shanghai Stock Exchange
Chinese brands
Software companies established in 1997